The Great Super Villain Contest is a 1984 role-playing game adventure published by Hero Games for Champions.

Contents
The Great Super Villain Contest is an adventure that deals with a massive competition among all the world's super-villains.

Reception
Allen Varney reviewed The Great Super Villain Contest in The Space Gamer No. 69. Varney commented that "you'll find The Great Super-Villain Contest exceptionally useful, rewarding, and high-power fun."

References

Champions (role-playing game) adventures
Role-playing game supplements introduced in 1984